Chowannur is a place in Thrissur district, state of Kerala, India.

Government
Kunnamkulam Municipality

Chowannur Grama Panchayat

Porkulam Grama Panchayat

Chowannur Block Panchayat - Villages in Chowannur Block Panchayat, Choondal, Chowannur, Kadangode, Kadavallur, Kandanassery, Kattakampal, Porkulam,  and Velur

Place to Visit
Chowannur Burial Cave is a prehistoric Megalithic rock cut cave situated in Chowannur. It is entered through a recessed opening on the east. The other sides of its chamber are circular and its vault hemispherical. On its northern and southern sides are two benches and there are five circular blocks along the western side of the chamber, which appear to be intended as stands for vessels.
Archaeological Survey of India has declared this cave as centrally protected monument.

Kalasmala is also known as Kallazhi Kunnu, Narimada Kunnu. Located in Akathiyoor, Part of Chowannur in Porkulam Pachayat. Kalasamala is a heavenly abode and a biodiversity heritage site (One of the five in the State, other four are Iringole near Perumbavur in Ernakulam District, Paliyeri Mookambika Temple in Karivellur near Kannur, Connolly Teak Plantation in Nilambur, Malappuram District and Pathiramanal Island near Muhamma in Alappuzha District). The view from the hill-top is enchanting.

Kalasamala is a temple grove where the deities are Lord Shiva and Lord Vishnu. The grove spread over in 3.5 acres is jammed with 110 critically endangered tree species known as Kulavetti or Vathamkollin in local language and Syzygium travancoricum scientifically which is included in the IUCN Red list. According to the Red list only less than 200 trees are left in the world.

There is a natural cave in the Kalasamala hill-top dating back to the Stone Age which is known as Narimada (the abode of Tiger). A temple surrounded by dense shola forest is an added attraction here.

Kalasamala has now become a tourist destination and cinema shooting place as it offers nature in its totality. Famous movies listed Ponthan Mada, Oomappenninu Uriyadappayyan

Churches and Temples

Kallazhy Temple

Siva Temple

Panthaloor Temple

Kalasa Mala Chirayil Temple

St. Thomas Catholic Church - The Tomb of Rev. Fr. Augustine John Ukken. Fr Augustine John Ukken was the parish priest here from 1928 till 1953, with a brief gap of 2 years. When he died in 1956, his body was buried inside the church.

St.Gregorios Orthodox Syrian Church

St. Mary's Orthodox Syrian Church, Ayyamparambu

Transport
There are two State Highways pass through Chowannur. SH50 is connect Chavakkad - Wadakkanchery in south and SH69 which is connecting Thrissur - Kuttippuram in north.

Notable Persons
 Rev. Fr. Augustine John Ukken
Antony Eastman

Distance to Nearest Cities
Thrissur - 23 km

Guruvayur - 10 km

Chavakkad - 12 km

Wadakkanchery - 19 km

Kuttippuram - 29 km

References

Villages in Thrissur district